There are 5,500 people of Russian origin living in Austria, mostly in Vienna and Salzburg.

There has been a Russian community in Vienna since the 17th century. The first Russians came in Austria for business and educational reasons. In the 1920s, the community grew after the Russian Civil War. Some more Russians came to Austria in the 1990s.

The Russian Embassy School in Vienna serves Russian families in the city.

Notable individuals

See also 
 Demographics of Austria
 Russian diaspora
 Russians
 Austria–Russia relations

External links 
 Russian cultural center in Vienna (in German and Russian only)
 Austrian-Russian Chamber of Commerce in Vienna (in German and Russian only)

Austria
Ethnic groups in Austria